The 2010 Extreme Sailing Series is the fourth edition of the sailing series. This is the first year without iShares as a sponsor. The 2010 series started in Sète, France on 27 May 2010 and ended in Almeria, Spain on 12 October 2010 and took place in 5 cities.

Acts

Act 1: Sète, France 
The first act of the series was held in Sète, France between 27–30 May 2010.

Act 2: Cowes, UK 
The second act of the series was held again in Cowes, UK again. The birthplace to the America's Cup, this act was held during Cowes Week between 31 July and 5 August 2010.

Act 3: Kiel, Germany 
Kiel, Germany was the host of the third act of the 2010 series, on the weekend of 26–29 August 2010.

Act 4: Trapani, Italy 
The fourth act of 2010 was in Trapani, Italy and was held on the weekend of 23–26 September 2010.

Act 5: Almeria, Spain 
Almeria, Spain was the fifth and final act for the series, and was held on 9–12 October 2010.

Team New Zealand entered a wildcard team into this regatta, finishing last. The crew was Dean Barker, Winston Macfarlane, Jeremy Lomas, James Dagg and Darren Bundock.

Teams

Results

References

External links 
 
 Official gallery

2010
2010 in sailing
2010 in French sport
2010 in English sport
2010 in German sport
2010 in Italian sport
2010 in Spanish sport